The Divine Comedy is a Chinese rock album released in June 2013.  The album is a collaboration between the artist Ai Weiwei and rock musician Zuoxiao Zuzhou.  The album contains protest songs against Chinese government's censorship and the treatment Ai Weiwei received under custody.

Songs 
 Just Climb the Wall
 Chaoyang Park
 Laoma Tihua
 Hotel USA
 Give Tomorrow Back to Me
 Dumbass

References

External links 
 The Divine Comedy - Official Website

2013 albums
Zuoxiao Zuzhou albums
Ai Weiwei albums